Jim Kokoris (born 1958) is an American novelist. He has written three books, The Rich Part of Life, Sister North, and The Pursuit of Other Interests.

Awards and Hollywood
The Rich Part of Life is the winner of the Friends of American Writers for Best First Novel of 2001 and has been optioned for film by Columbia Pictures. His novels are humorous yet poignant, and, like many authors, he sprinkles autobiographical references throughout his work.  The Rich Part of Life takes place in a suburb of Chicago, for example, and Kokoris and his family reside in a suburb outside of Chicago. The Pursuit of Other Interests focuses on the mid-life crisis of an advertising executive and Kokoris works as a public relations executive.

Influences
According to the author's website, he considers his two leading literary influences to be John Irving and Anne Tyler.

Kokoris has also contributed humour articles to the Chicago Sun-Times, Chicago Tribune, and Reader's Digest, among other publications.

Novels

 The Rich Part of Life (2001)
 Sister North (2003)
 The Pursuit of Other Interests (2009)
 It's. Nice. Outside. (2015)

References

 "Jim Kokoris." Contemporary Authors Online. Detroit: Gale, 2011. Subscription service.
  www.jimkokoris.net/ (May 15, 2012)

External links
Homepage

1950 births
Living people
21st-century American novelists
American male novelists
21st-century American male writers